This article includes information translated from the Wikipedia article « fr:Église Notre-Dame de Bon-Port »

Notre-Dame de Bon-Port is a Roman Catholic basilica located in Nantes, France. The church was constructed in 1846 by the architects Seheult and Joseph-Fleury Chenantais. Its official name is Église de Saint-Louis (Basilica of Saint-Louis), though it is rarely known by this name.

Location
The basilica is located in Nantes at the Place du Sanitat, facing the Quai de la Fosse (Quay of the Pit). The dome which tops it is modelled on that of Les Invalides in Paris. At the top of the spire lies an archangel representing Saint Gabriel.

External links

Old photo of the basilica
Gallery of photos

Roman Catholic churches in Nantes
Churches completed in 1846
19th-century Roman Catholic church buildings in France
Tourist attractions in Nantes